Somnath Khara (born 28 December 1986) is an Indian professional footballer who plays as a goalkeeper for Mohammedan S.C. in the I-League.

References 

1986 births
Living people
Indian footballers
Footballers from West Bengal
United SC players

Association football goalkeepers
I-League players